Büyükkışla may refer to:

 Büyükkışla, Ortaköy
 Büyükkışla, Şereflikoçhisar